The 32nd Genie Awards ceremony was held on March 8, 2012 to honour films released in 2011. Nominations were announced on January 17, 2012.

The ceremony was originally scheduled to be hosted by Andrea Martin and George Stroumboulopoulos, but Martin was forced to cancel at the last minute due to a rescheduled acting commitment. Stroumboulopoulos consequently hosted the ceremony alone, although he and Martin pretaped an introductory comedy segment in which they scrambled to find a replacement for Martin, including cameos by Martin Short, Chris Hyndman and Steven Sabados.

Performers
The nominees for Best Original Song were presented accompanied by choreographed figure skating routines by Jamie Salé, David Pelletier and Joannie Rochette.

Johnny Reid, The Sheepdogs and K'naan also performed during the ceremony.

Nominations

References

External links 

Genie Awards
Genie Awards
Genie Awards